Frieda is a surname. Notable people with the surname include:

John Frieda (born 1951), British hairstylist
Jordan Frieda (born 1977), British actor
Leonie Frieda (born 1956), Swedish-born UK-based writer and translator

See also
Afroditi Frida (born 1964), Greek singer